Bebearia is a genus of brush-footed butterflies.
The species are confined to the Afrotropical realm, mainly in the Guinean Forests of West Africa and the Congolian forests.

The genus Bebearia closely resembles the allied genus Euphaedra in appearance. The females, especially, are very similar on their uppersides. The undersides of Bebearia however are invariably cryptically patterned and often resemble dead leaves. In Euphaedra the underside is usually yellow with black spots and pink basal patches. Euphaedra have orange palpi while those of Bebearia are brown. In Euphaedra the forewing apex is always rounded and not falcate (sickle shaped). The member species are diverse.

Taxonomy
The type species of the genus is Euryphene iturina Karsch.

Species groups
Defining species groups is a convenient way of subdividing well-defined genera with a large number of recognized species. Bebearia species are so arranged in assemblages called "species groups" but (not superspecies, but an informal phenetic arrangement). These may or may not be clades. As molecular phylogenetic studies continue, lineages distinct enough to warrant some formal degree of recognition become evident and new groupings are suggested, but consistent ranking remains a problem.

Species
Subgenus Apectinaria Hecq, 1990
The tentyris species group
Bebearia abesa (Hewitson, 1869)
Bebearia absolon (Fabricius, 1793)
Bebearia amieti Hecq, 1994
Bebearia carshena (Hewitson, 1871)
Bebearia dallastai Hecq, 1994
Bebearia languida (Schultze, 1920)
Bebearia lucayensis Hecq, 1996
Bebearia mandinga (C. & R. Felder, 1860)
Bebearia micans Hecq, 1987
Bebearia osyris (Schultze, 1920)
Bebearia oxione (Hewitson, 1866)
Bebearia partita (Aurivillius, 1895)
Bebearia subtentyris (Strand, 1912)
Bebearia tentyris (Hewitson, 1866)
Bebearia zonara (Butler, 1871)
The comus species group
Bebearia cinaethon (Hewitson, 1874)
Bebearia comus (Ward, 1871)
Bebearia ikelemba (Aurivillius, 1901)
The mardania species group
Bebearia cocalia (Fabricius, 1793)
Bebearia cocalioides Hecq, 1990
Bebearia guineensis (C. & R. Felder, 1867)
Bebearia mardania (Fabricius, 1793)
Bebearia orientis (Karsch, 1895)
Bebearia senegalensis (Herrich-Schäffer, 1850)
The sophus species group
Bebearia sophus (Fabricius, 1793)
The barce species group
Bebearia barce (Doubleday, 1847)
The staudingeri species group
Bebearia staudingeri (Aurivillius, 1893)
The plistonax species group
Bebearia arcadius (Fabricius, 1793)
Bebearia plistonax (Hewitson, 1874)
The elpinice species group
Bebearia elpinice (Hewitson, 1869)
Bebearia hassoni Hecq, 1998
Unknown species group
Bebearia paludicola Holmes, 2001
Subgenus Bebearia
The brunhilda species group
Bebearia allardi Hecq, 1989
Bebearia brunhilda (Kirby, 1889)
Bebearia chriemhilda (Staudinger, 1895)
Bebearia congolensis (Capronnier, 1889)
Bebearia cottoni (Bethune-Baker, 1908)
Bebearia dowsetti Hecq, 1990
Bebearia fontainei Berger, 1981
Bebearia fulgurata (Aurivillius, 1904)
Bebearia hargreavesi D'Abrera, 1980
Bebearia laetitioides (Joicey & Talbot, 1921)
Bebearia schoutedeni (Overlaet, 1954)
The severini species group
Bebearia aurora (Aurivillius, 1896)
Bebearia discors Hecq, 1994
Bebearia improvisa Hecq, 2000
Bebearia juno Hecq, 1990
Bebearia kiellandi Hecq, 1993
Bebearia laetitia (Plötz, 1880)
Bebearia oremansi Hecq, 1994
Bebearia peetersi Hecq, 1994
Bebearia phranza (Hewitson, 1865)
Bebearia severini (Aurivillius, 1898)
Bebearia tessmanni (Grünberg, 1910)
The flaminia species group
Bebearia bioculata Hecq, 1998
Bebearia defluera Hecq, 1998
Bebearia denticula Hecq, 2000
Bebearia ducarmei Hecq, 1988
Bebearia flaminia (Staudinger, 1891)
Bebearia intermedia (Bartel, 1905)
Bebearia liberti Hecq, 1998
Bebearia maximiana (Staudinger, 1891)
Bebearia nivaria (Ward, 1871)
The phantasia species group
Bebearia demetra (Godart, 1819)
Bebearia leptotypa (Bethune-Baker, 1908)
Bebearia maledicta (Strand, 1912)
Bebearia phantasia (Hewitson, 1865)
Bebearia phantasiella (Staudinger, 1891)
Bebearia phantasina (Staudinger, 1891)
Bebearia tini Oremans, 1998
The cutteri species group
Bebearia ashantina (Dudgeon, 1913)
Bebearia barombina (Staudinger, 1895)
Bebearia baueri Hecq, 2000
Bebearia braytoni (Sharpe, 1907)
Bebearia chilonis (Hewitson, 1874)
Bebearia chloeropis (Bethune-Baker, 1908)
Bebearia cutteri (Hewitson, 1865)
Bebearia eliensis (Hewitson, 1866)
Bebearia equatorialis Hecq, 1989
Bebearia faraveli Oremans, 1998
Bebearia innocua Grose-Smith & Kirby, 1889
Bebearia jolyana Hecq, 1989
Bebearia luteola (Bethune-Baker, 1908)
Bebearia makala (Bethune-Baker, 1908)
Bebearia octogramma (Grose-Smith & Kirby, 1889)
Bebearia picturata Hecq, 1989
Bebearia raeveli Hecq, 1989
Unknown species group
Bebearia fontaineana Hecq, 1987
Bebearia inepta Hecq, 2001
Bebearia occitana Hecq, 1989
Bebearia omo Larsen & Warren, 2005
Bebearia warrengashi Hecq, 2000
Unknown subgenus
Bebearia bouyeri van de Weghe, 2007
Bebearia castanea (Holland, 1893)
Bebearia ducalis (Grünberg, 1912)
Bebearia ivindoensis van de Weghe, 2007
Bebearia lopeensis van de Weghe, 2007
Bebearia pulchella Hecq, 2006
Bebearia romboutsi Hecq, 2001
Bebearia vandeweghei Hecq, 2005

References

Seitz, A. Die Gross-Schmetterlinge der Erde 13: Die Afrikanischen Tagfalter. Plate XIII 40 et seq.

External links
Bebearia types  Royal Museum for Central Africa images

 
Limenitidinae
Nymphalidae genera
Taxa named by Francis Hemming